Gianluigi Trovesi (born 1944) is an Italian jazz saxophonist, clarinetist, and composer. He has won various Italian jazz awards. He also teaches in Italy.

Early life
Trovesi was born in Nembro near Bergamo in Lombardy in 1944. He studied harmony and counterpoint under Vittorio Fellegara.

Later life and career
In 1978 Trovesi won the "RAI TV National Competition for Saxophone and Clarinet" in 1978, and the Critics' National Prize for his debut album, Baghet. He won Best Italian Disc for the albums Dances (1985), From G to G (1992) and Les Hommes Armés (1996).

Trovesi has toured, recorded and performed with Anthony Braxton, Misha Mengelberg, Horace Tapscott, Steve Lacy, Evan Parker, Kenny Wheeler, Mark Dresser, Han Bennink, Tony Oxley and Günter Sommer.

Trovesi is a member of the Italian Instabile Orchestra and performs in a duo with accordionist Gianni Coscia. He teaches in Italy.

Discography

As leader

 w/ Gianni Coscia

 w/ Gianni Coscia

 w/ Gianni Coscia

 w/ Gianni Coscia
 w/ Anat Fort

As contributor

Marche jazz orchestra, year =1989 "Dies Irae", Philology

Filmography
 Il cortile della musica (The Music Court), (2010)

References

External links
Official site
The Music Court

1944 births
Living people
Musicians from the Province of Bergamo
Italian jazz saxophonists
Male saxophonists
Italian jazz clarinetists
Folk jazz musicians
Post-bop jazz musicians
Free jazz musicians
ECM Records artists
20th-century Italian musicians
21st-century Italian musicians
20th-century saxophonists
21st-century saxophonists
21st-century clarinetists
20th-century Italian male musicians
21st-century Italian male musicians
Male jazz musicians
Italian Instabile Orchestra members